Yagami (Usually written as 八神 "eight, god") is a Japanese surname. Notable people with the surname include:

 , Japanese manga artist
  (born 1967), Japanese manga artist
  (born 1958), a popular Japanese recording artist
  (born 1966), Japanese manga artist
 Yagami Toll (born 1962), drummer for the Japanese rock band BUCK-TICK since 1985
  (born 1969), Japanese manga artist

Fictional characters:
, Video game character from The King of Fighters series
, Fictional Character from the sequels to the Japanese anime series Magical Girl Lyrical Nanoha, A's and StrikerS
 - Fictional character from the Japanese manga and anime series Maison Ikkoku
, a character in the manga series New Game!
, Soichiro Yagami, Sachiko Yagami, and Sayu Yagami - Fictional characters from the Japanese manga and anime series Death Note
Note that the kanji characters used in this case are different - 夜神 means "night, god"
 - Fictional character from the visual novel Ever17 ~the out of infinity~
, Fictional character from the Light novel, manga and anime series, Kaze no Stigma, also known as Stigma of the Wind.
, Fictional character from the video game Judgment and its sequel. A spin-off series from Yakuza.

See also 
 9788 Yagami, outer main-belt asteroid
 Yagami, Tokyo (矢上), neighborhood in Tokyo, Japan, near Keio University
 Yagami Station

Japanese-language surnames